Dodoni is a village and a municipality in the Ioannina regional unit, Epirus, Greece. The seat of the municipality is the village Agia Kyriaki (community Theriakisi).

The modern village of Dodoni is located near the ancient city of same name and site of the ancient oracle of Dodona. Oedipus the King was shot here in 1967.

Municipality
The present municipality Dodoni was formed at the 2011 local government reform by the merger of the following 4 former municipalities, that became municipal units:
Agios Dimitrios
Dodoni
Lakka Souliou
Selloi

The municipality Dodoni has an area of 657.499 km2, the municipal unit Dodoni has an area of 101.016 km2, and the community Dodoni has an area of 8.748 km2.

Gallery

References

Populated places in Ioannina (regional unit)
Municipalities of Epirus (region)
Cities in ancient Greece